Lee Heung-kam (13 January 1932 – 4 January 2021) was a Hong Kong Cantonese opera and TVB actress.

Career
She joined the entertainment industry when she was 14 years old. Since 1960, she became known for being an antagonist in many Cantonese operas, films and TV drama series. This lasted until the 80's when her roles were re-typecasted as a kind mother or a spiteful mother-in-law.

Over 70 years in the acting profession, Lee has played the roles of mother, mother-in-law and grandmother of many famous Chinese actors and actresses. Each role has different personality and emotion, demonstrating her superb acting skills.

Lee was also the god-mother of many celebrities, for example Chow Yun-fat, Carol Cheng, Cherie Chung, Andy Lau, Maggie Cheung etc.

In 1972, Lee joined TVB. Lee was known for Enjoy Yourself Tonight. 

In 1974, Lee and Tam Ping-man, an actor and on-screen partner, co-founded a production company. One of their most popular duets is Can You Come Back, which was featured in the comedy Rose Rose I Love You in 1993, they performed this song many times on stage together.

Filmography
Aliases: Li Hsiang-Chun, Li Xiang-Jun

Films 
Thus is a partial list of films.
 1960 Lady Racketeer. 
 1960 Miss Pony-Tail 
 1960 Rear Entrance - Mandy Hui Shuk Wan
 1961 The Pistol - Lu Xiao-Yin
 1961 The Witch-Girl, He Yue'er 
 1961 The Golden Trumpet 
 1962 Dream of the Red Chamber - 1st Master's wife
 1962 The Mid-Nightmare 
 1962 Yang Kwei Fei - Lady Mei/Jiang Cai Pin
 1962 When Fortune Smiles 
 1963 The Love Eterne - Student
 1963 The Adulteress - Yang's Wife
 1963 Return of the Phoenix - Cheng Xue-E
 1963 Mid-Nightmare (Part 2) 
 1963 Boundan 
 1964 Comedy of Mismatches - Sun Zhuyi (Guest Star)
 1965 Move Over, Darling 
 1966 Dawn Will Come - Yan Qiurong
 1967 A Gifted Scholar and a Beautiful Maid (aka Merry Maid) 
 1967 The Golden Swallow 
 1967 The Long Journey Home - Madam Chui. 
 1967 Madame Lee Sze-Sze (aka Li Shi-Shi)  
 1967 Maiden Thief 
 1967 Making a Living in a Blind Way 
 1967 Terrors Over Nothing 
 1967 Uproar in Jade Hall - Chun-Fa. 
 1967 Who Should Be the Commander-in-Chief? 
 1968 The Land of Many Perfumes - Empress
 1969 The Three Lucky Men 
 1969 Raw Passions - Tao Ai Jun
 1969 Dark Semester - Lin Hui Wo
 1970 	The Young Girl Dares Not Homeward (aka Girl Wanders Around) - Miss Hua.
 1970 The Lucky Trio Are Here Again
 1977 Love Rings a Bell
 1958/1959 Story of the Vulture Conqueror 
 1959 Story of the White-Haired Demon Girl
 1991 Dances with Dragon 
 1992 All's Well, Ends Well 
 1993 The Bride with White Hair 2 
 1996 Thanks for Your Love 
 2009 All's Well, Ends Well 2009 
 2010 All's Well, Ends Well 2010 
 2010 Bruce Lee, My Brother 
 2011 All's Well, Ends Well 2011 
 2012 All's Well, Ends Well 2012 
 2012 Eight Happiness 2012

TV series

Awards 
 2011 Lifetime Achievement Award.

Personal life 
In 1950, Lee married Siu Chung-kwan, a Cantonese opera singer. They had a daughter, Siu Ji-wan. 

Lee had been forced to retire from acting in 2011 due to Alzheimer's disease, her condition deteriorated in December 2020. 

On January 4, 2021, Lee died in Hong Kong. Lee was 88 years old. 9 days before her 89th birthday, Lee fainted while having dinner, and was pronounced dead en route to  Queen Elizabeth Hospital, Hong Kong.

References

External links 
 Lee Heung-kam at hkmdb.com
 Lee Heung-kam at hkcinemagic.com
 Lee Heung-kam at IMDB.com

Hong Kong film actresses
Hong Kong Cantonese opera actresses
People from Foshan
TVB veteran actors
1932 births
2021 deaths
Actresses from Guangdong
Hong Kong television actresses
Hong Kong people of Shun Tak descent
Macau people
20th-century Hong Kong actresses
21st-century Hong Kong actresses
Chinese film actresses
Chinese television actresses
20th-century Chinese actresses
21st-century Chinese actresses
20th-century Hong Kong women singers
Singers from Guangdong